|}

The Kingsfurze Novice Hurdle is a Grade 3 National Hunt hurdle race in Ireland. 
It is run at Naas over a distance of about 2 miles (3,218 metres), and it is scheduled to take place each year in March.

The race was first run in 2013 with Listed status. It was raised to Grade 3 in 2021.

Records
Most successful jockey (2 wins):
 Davy Russell - 	Cedarwood Road (2020), Irish Point (2023)  

Most successful trainer (3 wins): 
 Gordon Elliott–  Sutton Place (2016), Cartwright (2018), Irish Point (2023)

Winners

See also
 Horse racing in Ireland
 List of Irish National Hunt races

References 
Racing Post: 

National Hunt hurdle races
National Hunt races in Ireland
Naas Racecourse